Thomas M. Bakk (born June 8, 1954) is a Minnesota politician. He served in the Minnesota legislature from 1995 to 2023 and is a former majority leader and minority leader.

Early life, education, and career
Bakk was born and raised in Cook, Minnesota, where he graduated from Cook High School in 1972. He received an associate degree from Mesabi Community College and a bachelor's degree in business administration and labor relations from the University of Minnesota Duluth. He is a retired union carpenter and labor official.

Political career

Minnesota House of Representatives 
Bakk represented District 6A in the Minnesota House of Representatives from 1995 to 2003.

Minnesota Senate
Bakk was first elected to the Minnesota Senate in 2002 and was re-elected in 2006, 2010, 2012, and 2016. After the 2010 election, in which Republicans gained control of the Senate for the first time since party designation, Bakk was elected by his caucus to serve as its first-ever minority leader. After the DFL regained a majority in the 2012 election, Bakk was elected by his caucus to serve as majority leader, a position he assumed when the legislature convened on January 8, 2013. Bakk was again elected by his caucus to serve as minority leader following the 2016 election, which saw Republicans re-gain control of the upper chamber.

In late 2019, it was reported that Susan Kent, a state senator from Woodbury, intended to challenge Bakk for his caucus leadership post. On February 1, 2020, in a caucus meeting that lasted more than six hours, Kent defeated Bakk, succeeding him as minority leader.

Three weeks after the 2020 elections, when it was determined that the DFL did not win a majority in the Senate, Bakk and fellow DFL state senator David Tomassoni announced they would no longer caucus with Democrats and instead form their own “independent caucus.” Republican Majority Leader Paul Gazelka welcomed the move and gave Bakk the chairmanship to the Capital Investment in exchange for voting in line with the Republican Party on floor votes. This changed the composition of the Senate to 34 Republicans, 31 Democrats, and two independents.

In March 2022, Bakk announced he was not seeking re-election to the State Senate and would retire from politics at the end of the year.

2010 Minnesota gubernatorial campaign

Bakk campaigned in the 2010 Minnesota gubernatorial election. He led in early fundraising among the DFL candidates, raising $146,000 in 2008, and beginning 2009 with a little more than $131,000. He ended his campaign in March 2010.

Electoral history

Personal life
Bakk and his wife, Laura, who works as a legislative assistant in the Minnesota Senate, have four children.

See also
 Minnesota gubernatorial election, 2010

References

External links

Official Minnesota Senate website

|-

|-

|-

|-

1954 births
Living people
21st-century American politicians
American Lutherans
Members of the Minnesota House of Representatives
Minnesota Democrats
Minnesota Independents
Minnesota state senators
People from Cook County, Minnesota
People from Virginia, Minnesota
University of Minnesota Duluth alumni